Douglassville may refer to the following places in the United States:

 Douglassville, Pennsylvania
 Douglassville, Texas

See also
 Douglasville, Georgia